Veronica Porché Anderson (formerly Porché Ali) is an American woman, the widow of American singer Carl Anderson and formerly the third wife of American boxer Muhammad Ali. She is the mother of Ali's two daughters Hana and actress and undefeated professional boxer Laila Ali. In May 2007, she appeared with her two daughters on Dancing with the Stars.

References

External links

Living people
Muhammad Ali family
Year of birth missing (living people)